John Williams  (born John Fielding; 24 May 1857 – 25 November 1932) was a Welsh recipient of the Victoria Cross, the highest and most prestigious award for gallantry in the face of the enemy that can be awarded to British and Commonwealth forces.

Details
John Fielding was the second eldest of ten children. John's parents were Michael and Margaret Godsil, who married in Abergavenny, Wales in 1855. Both Michael and Margaret were from Cork, Ireland. Michael Fielding died at the age of 82 and is buried in the Cwmbran cemetery. John was born at Merthyr Road, Abergavenny. The entire family were Catholic. Born Fielding, he enlisted under the name of Williams in the Monmouthshire Militia in 1877.

Williams was 21 years old, and a private in the 2nd Battalion, 24th Regiment of Foot (later The South Wales Borderers), British Army during the Anglo-Zulu War when the following deed took place for which he was awarded the VC. It is known neither why he chose to join the army, nor why he enlisted in a name other than his own. (It may possibly have been to avoid being traced after running away from home).

On 22–23 January 1879 at Rorke's Drift, Natal, South Africa, Private Williams and two other men held a distant room of the hospital for more than an hour until they had no ammunition left, when the Zulus burst in and killed one of the men and two patients. Meanwhile, Private Williams had succeeded in knocking a hole in the partition and took the two remaining patients through into the next ward. He was there joined by Alfred Henry Hook, and working together (one holding the enemy at bayonet point while the other broke through three more partitions) they were able to bring eight patients into the inner line of defence. His citation read:

Williams was presented with his VC in Gibraltar by Major-General Anderson, Governor of Gibraltar in 1880.

Further information
Fielding later achieved the rank of Sergeant in the 3rd Volunteer Battalion, South Wales Borderers. In 1914, he volunteered for service and served on the SWB Depot staff at Brecon throughout World War I and served as a recruiting agent for them. He married Elizabeth Murphy in 1884 and they had 3 sons and 3 daughters; one son was killed while serving with 1/SWB during the Retreat from Mons in 1914.

He died from heart failure in Cwmbran on 24 November 1932. The nursing home directly opposite his burial place in Llantarnam, Cwmbran, was later named in his honour, as was a local pub, the John Fielding, where a picture of him is displayed.

The medal
His Victoria Cross was donated to the SWB Museum by the Fielding family and is displayed at the Regimental Museum of The Royal Welsh in Brecon, Powys, Wales.

Parade
The South Wales Argus revealed in January 2019 that the annual parade, to remember Fielding's heroism, had been cancelled for "health and safety" reasons.

Notes

References
Monuments to Courage Harvey, David. (1999).
John Williams VC: A Biography Lloyd, W.G. (1993)
The Register of the Victoria Cross This England. (1997)

External links
John Williams (Fielding) (biography, photos, memorial details)
Location of grave and VC medal
The location of his grave is at coordinates 

1857 births
Military personnel from Monmouthshire
1932 deaths
British recipients of the Victoria Cross
British Army personnel of World War I
Anglo-Zulu War recipients of the Victoria Cross
British Militia soldiers
South Wales Borderers soldiers
People from Abergavenny
British Army personnel of the Anglo-Zulu War
British Army recipients of the Victoria Cross
Welsh recipients of the Victoria Cross
Burials in Wales